Adam Kardasz (born November 1, 1983) is a Polish footballer from Bydgoszcz, spending the majority of his career in or in the vicinity of his hometown.

External links
 

1983 births
Living people
Polish footballers
Widzew Łódź players
Unia Janikowo players
Sportspeople from Bydgoszcz
Association football midfielders